Dia
is free and open source general-purpose diagramming software, developed originally by Alexander Larsson. It uses a controlled single document interface (SDI) similar to GIMP and Inkscape.

Features 
Dia has a modular design with several shape packages available for different needs: flowchart, network diagrams, circuit diagrams, and more. It does not restrict symbols and connectors from various categories from being placed together.

Dia has special objects to help draw entity-relationship models, Unified Modeling Language (UML) diagrams, flowcharts, network diagrams, and simple electrical circuits. It is also possible to add support for new shapes by writing simple XML files, using a subset of Scalable Vector Graphics (SVG) to draw the shape.

Dia loads and saves diagrams in a custom XML format which is, by default, gzipped to save space. It can print large diagrams spanning multiple pages and can also be scripted using the Python programming language.

Exports 
Dia can export diagrams to various formats, including:
 EPS (Encapsulated PostScript)
 SVG (Scalable Vector Graphics)
 DXF (Autocad's Drawing Interchange format)
 CGM (Computer Graphics Metafile, defined by ISO standard 8632)
 WMF (Windows Meta File)
 PNG (Portable Network Graphics)
 JPEG (Joint Photographic Experts Group)
 VDX (Microsoft's XML for Visio Drawing)

Development 

Dia was originally created by Alexander Larsson, but he moved on to work on GNOME and other projects. James Henstridge took over as lead developer, but he also moved on to other projects. He was followed by Cyrille Chepelov, then Lars Ræder Clausen.

Dia is currently maintained by Hans Breuer, Steffen Macke and Sameer Sahasrabuddhe.

It is written in C, and has an extension system which also supports writing extensions in Python.

See also 

 ATLAS Transformation Language – Dia diagrams may be generated by ATL model transformations
 Diagrams.net
 List of UML tools
 List of vector graphics editors

References

External links

 Dia Project Homepage
 Dia for Windows

Concept- and mind-mapping software for Linux
Cross-platform free software
Cross-platform software
Diagramming software
Free diagramming software
Free software programmed in C
Free UML tools
Free vector graphics editors
GNOME Applications
Office software that uses GTK
Portable software
Unix software
Vector graphics editors for Linux
Windows graphics-related software